The 2022–23 Armenian Premier League, known as the VBET Armenian Premier League for sponsorship reasons, is the 31st season of the league since its establishment.

Season events
On 4 July 2022, the FFA announced that Lernayin Artsakh (promoted after a seventeen-year absence) would play in the upcoming Armenian Premier League season, along with Pyunik, Ararat-Armenia, Alashkert, Ararat Yerevan, Urartu, Noah, Van, BKMA Yerevan and Shirak.

Teams

Personnel and sponsorship

Managerial changes

League table

Fixtures and results

Round 1–18

Round 19–36

Season statistics

Top scorers

Hat-tricks

Clean sheets

References

External links
 

Armenian Premier League seasons
Arm
1